The Lodge Corollary was a corollary to the Monroe Doctrine. Proposed by Henry Cabot Lodge and ratified by the U.S. Senate in 1912, it forbade any foreign power or foreign interest of any kind from acquiring sufficient territory in the Western Hemisphere as to put that government in "practical power of control." As Lodge argued, the corollary reaffirmed the basic right of nations to provide for their safety and extended the principles behind the Monroe Doctrine beyond colonialism to include corporate territorial acquisitions as well.

The proposal was a reaction to negotiations between a Japanese syndicate and Mexico for the purchase of a considerable portion of Baja California including a harbor considered to be of strategic value, Magdalena Bay. After the ratification of the Lodge Corollary, Japan disavowed any connection to the syndicate, and the deal was never completed.

External links 
 Lodge's defense of the corollary before the 62nd Congress

Monroe Doctrine
Foreign policy doctrines of the United States
1912 in the United States
1912 in international relations